Christian Junior Koloko (born 20 June 2000) is a Cameroonian professional basketball player for the Toronto Raptors of the National Basketball Association (NBA). He played college basketball for the Arizona Wildcats. He was named first-team All-Pac-12 and was voted the Pac-12 Defensive Player of the Year after his junior season.

High school career
Koloko is a native of Douala, Cameroon and attended Collège Libermann in his hometown. He grew up playing football and started playing basketball at age 12. In 2017, Koloko moved to the United States to play basketball for Birmingham High School in Lake Balboa, California as a junior, despite not speaking English at first. For his senior season, he transferred to Sierra Canyon School in Chatsworth, California, where he was teammates with Cassius Stanley, Kenyon Martin Jr. and Scotty Pippen Jr. Koloko helped his team claim its second straight Open Division state title. A four-star recruit, he committed to playing college basketball for Arizona over offers from California, Northwestern, Vanderbilt, Harvard and Princeton.

College career
As a freshman at Arizona, Koloko averaged 2.3 points and 2.4 rebounds per game. In his sophomore season, he averaged 5.3 points and 4.8 rebounds per game. On 21 November 2021, Koloko posted a career-high 22 points, seven rebounds and four blocks in an 80–62 win over fourth-ranked Michigan at the Roman Main Event title game, earning tournament MVP honors. As a junior, he was named Pac-12 Defensive Player of the Year, Pac-12 Most Improved Player, and first-team All-Pac-12. 

On 18 April 2022, Koloko declared for the 2022 NBA draft, forgoing his remaining college eligibility.

Professional career

Toronto Raptors (2022–present)
Koloko was selected with the 33rd overall pick in the 2022 NBA Draft by the Toronto Raptors. On August 26, 2022, Koloko signed a rookie-scale contract with the Raptors.

Career statistics

College

|-
| style="text-align:left;"| 2019–20
| style="text-align:left;"| Arizona
| 28 || 0 || 8.3 || .483 || .000 || .350 || 2.4 || .2 || .3 || .9 || 2.3
|-
| style="text-align:left;"| 2020–21
| style="text-align:left;"| Arizona
| 26 || 19 || 17.3 || .520 || .000 || .625 || 4.8 || .3 || .5 || 1.3 || 5.3
|-
| style="text-align:left;"| 2021–22
| style="text-align:left;"| Arizona
| 37 || 37 || 25.4 || .635 || .000 || .735 || 7.3 || 1.4 || .8 || 2.8 || 12.6
|- class="sortbottom"
| style="text-align:center;" colspan="2"| Career
| 91 || 56 || 17.9 || .590 || .000 || .670 || 5.1 || .7 || .5 || 1.8 || 7.3

References

External links
Arizona Wildcats bio

2000 births
Living people
Arizona Wildcats men's basketball players
Birmingham High School alumni
Cameroonian expatriate basketball people in Canada
Cameroonian expatriate basketball people in the United States
Cameroonian men's basketball players
Centers (basketball)
National Basketball Association players from Cameroon
Raptors 905 players
Sierra Canyon School alumni
Sportspeople from Douala
Toronto Raptors draft picks
Toronto Raptors players